The Comanche Trail, sometimes called the Comanche War Trail or the Comanche Trace, was a travel route in Texas established by the nomadic Comanche nation.

Description 
The route ran from the Comanche summer hunting grounds to the Rio Grande, where the Spanish had established a line of missions and presidios during the eighteenth century in what was then called New Spain, which the Comanche would raid. Although called a "trail," the Comanche Trail was actually a network of parallel and branching trails, always following sources of good water. By 1857 parts of the trail had been named and appeared on maps.

Following water sources, the primary trail ran north from two starting points on the Rio Grande River, one at Boquillas and the other at Presidio, with crossings of the river at both locations. The legs of the trail met at Comanche Springs, near Fort Stockton, Texas and Las Moras Springs near Fort Clark. The trail continued north to cross the Pecos River in the vicinity of Horsehead Crossing, bending northeast to the area of Odessa and Big Spring, Texas. From there the Comanche Trail ran east past the Caprock Escarpment and on across the Llano Estacado by two separate routes. One branch ran to the vicinity of Lubbock and along the Double Mountains (Texas) fork of the Brazos River to near the present site of Abernathy, to near Littlefield, then via a series of springs to the Pecos River near Fort Sumner. A separate fork ran from Big Spring, Texas to near Plainview, Texas, rejoining the other route to the east of Muleshoe. Northern branches of the trail ran through the Texas Panhandle into Oklahoma, Colorado and Kansas. Southern branches extended into northern Mexico through Chihuahua, Coahuila and Durango to Zacatecas and San Luis Potosi, while an eastern fork ran from Big Spring, Texas southeast to Nuevo Leon and Tamaulipas.

The Comanche Trail was noted as a beaten path as much as a mile wide. Much of the southeastern leg of the main trail runs through what is now Big Bend National Park, leaving the park through Persimmon Gap in the Santiago Mountains in the northern portion of the park. U.S. Route 385 follows the same route through parts of the park.

See also
Comancheria
Comanchero
Treaty of Guadalupe Hidalgo

References

External links
 The Comanche Trail at Big Bend National Park
 Comanche Trail at the Handbook of Texas Online
 Detailed color map of the Great Comanche War Trail

Historic trails and roads in Texas
Trails and roads in the American Old West